Vitor Eduardo da Silva Matos (born 2 February 2000), commonly known as Vitão, is a Brazilian professional footballer who plays as a defender for Brazilian side Internacional, on loan from Ukrainian club Shakhtar Donetsk.

Career statistics

Club

Honours

Club
Palmeiras
Campeonato Brasileiro Série A: 2018
Shaktar Donetsk
Ukrainian Super Cup: 2021

References

2000 births
Living people
Brazilian footballers
Brazil youth international footballers
Association football defenders
Campeonato Brasileiro Série A players
Ukrainian Premier League players
Sociedade Esportiva Palmeiras players
FC Shakhtar Donetsk players
Sport Club Internacional players
Brazil under-20 international footballers
Brazilian expatriate footballers
Brazilian expatriate sportspeople in Ukraine
Expatriate footballers in Ukraine